Eduardo Enrique Castro Luque (12 December 1963 – 14 September 2012) was the deputy-elect of Ciudad Obregón, Sonora, Mexico and a member of the Institutional Revolutionary Party (PRI).

Born and raised in Ciudad Obregón, Castro Luque ran for office in his municipality and was elected as a state legislature for Sonora in the Congress of Mexico on 1 July 2012. Before running for office, he had served as the marketing manager of the Yaquis de Obregón baseball team in his hometown and was working at his privately owned publicity agency. On 14 September 2012, two days before entering office, he was gunned down outside his home by gunmen. He was later pronounced dead at a local hospital.

Northern Mexico has been the scene of violent confrontations between Mexico's drug gangs. The recent wave of violence in Ciudad Obregón is attributed to the Sinaloa Cartel and the Beltrán-Leyva Cartel, which fight for the control of retail drug sales and the smuggling routes leading to the United States.

Personal life
Eduardo Enrique Castro Luque was born on 12 December 1963 in the Mexican northern city of Ciudad Obregón, Sonora. He was married to Rossana Coboj and had one boy named Eduardo. He held a bachelor's degree in Business administration from the Sonora Institute of Technology.

The 48-year-old politician had never held a political office before he was elected on 1 July 2012.

Prior to running for office, Castro Luque owned a publicity agency and was the marketing manager of the Yaquis de Obregón baseball team in his hometown.

Assassination
Initial reports stated that on 14 September 2012 at around 20:55 local time, Castro Luque was returning home at Chapultepec neighborhood in the city of Ciudad Obregón, Sonora. Unaware of the assailant, the deputy-elect got out of his car and made a few steps towards the house entrance when an unknown gunman shot at him nine times, hitting vital organs. Nonetheless, according to the investigation of the Office of the General Prosecutor in Sonora (PJGE), the gunman faked a malfunction in his motorcycle when Castro Luque was coming back from a meeting held in Hermosillo prior to his installation as a state deputy. The assassin then asked Castro Luque for tool support and then shot him at close range. Once they had materialized the attack, the killer fled the scene in a motorcycle. Castro Luque was taken to a local hospital by his wife and young son while still being alive, but was declared dead an hour later. He was scheduled to take office as a Sonora's state Legislature in just two days.

The Municipal Police of Cajeme, Sonora reported that Castro Luque's front house door had been forced open and that some people had stolen his laptop a day before the assassination. At the scene, the Mexican police found six .45 millimeter bullet casings, as well as six warheads from the same caliber, that will help the Office of the General Prosecutor in Sonora (PGJE) as evidence for the investigation.

Funeral
At 3:00 p.m. during a religious ceremony in the Cathedral of Ciudad Obregón, friends, supporters, politicians, and several citizens of the municipality gathered to pay homage to Castro Luque. The Bishop Felipe Padilla celebrated mass with over 900 attendees.

Background
Since the start of Mexico's drug war, northern Mexico has been the scene of numerous battles between several drug trafficking organizations fighting for the control of the local drug markets and the smuggling routes leading to the United States. The municipality of Cajeme, Sonora – where Castro Luque was killed – is reportedly under dispute between two drug groups: the Sinaloa Cartel and the Beltrán-Leyva Cartel.

In August 2012, Édgar Morales Pérez, the mayor-elect of a town in San Luis Potosí, was ambushed and killed by gunmen before taking office. Just like Castro Luque, Morales Pérez was a member of the Institutional Revolutionary Party (PRI).

Investigation and arrests
The Attorney General of Sonora established a special investigation group to carry out the inquiry of Castro Luque's assassination.

On 24 September 2012, the PGJE indicated that Manuel Ernesto Fernández Félix, the substitute deputy of Ciudad Obregón, ordered the assassination of Castro Luque so he could go into office. In Mexico, political candidates have to appoint a person to take over their duties if they die or are unable to serve. Sonora authorities accused Fernández Félix of paying a hitman more than $3000 to carry out the attack and of paying around $750 to the person who helped him find the assassin. Fernández Félix is currently a fugitive, while the other five implicated in the assassination are arrested. The Interpol, along with authorities in Mexico and the United States, are currently looking for the substitute deputy in over 190 countries.

Several water-rights activists, however, question the theory of the Mexican prosecutors that the assassination was carried out by Castro Luque's substitute. The activists of the Citizen Movement for Water stated that Castro Luque had launched a massive political campaign against a water project in Ciudad Obregón, and criticized the state government for constructing an aqueduct despite the judicial orders to suspend it. They allege that since the state of Sonora is ruled by the National Action Party (PAN), the investigation is too biased to be executed properly. Politicians in the Institutional Revolutionary Party (PRI) also expressed their doubts on the theory of the state prosecutors of the PAN administration.

Legacy
Several organizations carried out a "mega march" throughout Ciudad Obregón in memory of Castro Luque on 26 September 2012.

See also
Mexican Drug War
Jaime Serrano Cedillo
List of politicians killed in the Mexican Drug War

References

External links
 Eduardo Castro Luque on Twitter
 Eduardo Castro Luque on Facebook
  Acuden políticos al IMSS (archive) – El Imparcial
   — Milenio (Video)

1963 births
2012 deaths
Institutional Revolutionary Party politicians
Mexican murder victims
Assassinated Mexican politicians
Deaths by firearm in Mexico
People from Ciudad Obregón
Politicians from Sonora
21st-century Mexican politicians
2012 murders in Mexico
Sonora Institute of Technology alumni
Male murder victims